The government of József Antall was the first governing cabinet of Hungary after the end of Communism.  It was elected in 1990 in the first free and fair democratic elections since 1945.  The government was a center-right coalition of the Hungarian Democratic Forum, the Independent Smallholders' Party and the Christian Democratic People's Party. The government began the process of transitioning to a market economy, overseeing the withdrawal of Soviet troops, and consolidating Hungary's new multi-party order.

The government underwent a minor crisis when the FKGP split into two groups on 24 February 1992. A group of 33 then 36 MPs) continued to support the government, while a group of 12 then 10 MPs went into opposition.  The former officially established the United Smallholders' Party in November 1993.

Antall died in office on 12 December 1993, and Interior Minister Péter Boross subsequently took over as Prime Minister.

Party breakdown

Beginning of term
Party breakdown of cabinet ministers in the beginning of term:

End of term
Party breakdown of cabinet ministers in the end of term:

Composition

References 

József Bölöny: Magyarország kormányai 1848–2004 (Governments of Hungary from 1848 to 2004) Az 1987–2004 közötti időszakot feldolgozta és sajtó alá rendezte Hubai László. 5. bővített és javított kiadás. (the period between 1987 and 2004 was written by László Hubai) Budapest, Akadémiai Kiadó. 2004. ISBN 963-05-8106-X

Hungarian governments
1993 establishments in Hungary
1994 disestablishments in Hungary
Cabinets established in 1993
Cabinets disestablished in 1994